Włodzimierz Bartoszewicz  (3 July 1899 – 8 August 1983) was a Polish painter. He was born in Lviv. His work was part of the painting event in the art competition at the 1936 Summer Olympics.

References

External links
Biography 

1899 births
1983 deaths
Artists from Lviv
People from the Kingdom of Galicia and Lodomeria
20th-century Polish painters
20th-century Polish male artists
Olympic competitors in art competitions
Polish male painters